Suan Miang is a sub-district in Chat Trakan District of Phitsanulok Province, Thailand.

Geography
Suan Miang lies in the Nan Basin, which is part of the Chao Phraya Watershed.

Administration
The following is a list of the sub-district's muban, which roughly correspond to villages:

Temples
Active Buddhist temples in Suan Miang:
วัดสวนเมี่ยง in Ban Suan Miang
วัดหนองขาหย่าง in Ban Nong Kayang
วัดห้วยหมากกล่ำ in Ban Huai Mak Lam
วัดโคกใหญ่ in Ban Khok Yai
วัดแก่งบัวคำ in Ban Kaeng Bua Kham 
วัดห้วยช้างแทง in Ban Noen Chang Thaeng
วัดเนินช้างแทง in Ban Noen Chang Thaeng

References

Tambon of Phitsanulok province
Populated places in Phitsanulok province